Alen Lončar (born January 21, 1974) is a retired male freestyle swimmer from Croatia, who competed in two consecutive Summer Olympics for his native country, starting in 1996.

References
 sports-reference
 Profile

1974 births
Living people
Croatian male swimmers
Croatian male freestyle swimmers
Olympic swimmers of Croatia
Swimmers at the 1996 Summer Olympics
Swimmers at the 2000 Summer Olympics
Sportspeople from Rijeka